Goodenia crenata is a species of flowering plant in the family Goodeniaceae and endemic to north-western Australia. It is a perennial, herb with oblong, elliptic or egg-shaped leaves in a rosette at the base of the plant, and leafy racemes of yellow flowers.

Description

Taxonomy and naming
Goodenia crenata was first formally described in 2001 by Roger Charles Carolin and Leigh William Sage in the journal Nuytsia from material collected at Glass Hill in the east Kimberley in 1999. The specific epithet (crenata) means "scalloped" and refers to the edges of the leaves.

Distribution and habitat
This goodenia mostly grows near water holes, creeks and rocky outcrops in the Ord Victoria Plain, Central Kimberley and Tanami biogeographic regions of northern Western Australia and the Northern Territory.

Conservation status
Goddenia crenata is classified as "Priority Three" by the Government of Western Australia Department of Parks and Wildlife meaning that it is poorly known and known from only a few locations but is not under imminent threat.

References

crenata
Eudicots of Western Australia
Flora of the Northern Territory
Plants described in 2001
Taxa named by Roger Charles Carolin